The Mansion House, located on Richmond Road, was the official residence of the Lord Mayor of Cardiff until 1971. It was designed in 1896 by the architects Habershon & Fawckner for James Howell, the owner of Howells department store. It was originally called 'The Grove'.

James Howell was a Cardiff businessman who opened his first shop in 1865.  In 1890 he made arrangements to build a property on land leased from Lord Tredegar. The plans were for a large family home, to house his 11 children. An unusual aspect of the house is that it was designed to be able to be divided into two: it has two front doors and a wall in the cellar was designed allow extension upwards. The house was bought by the Cardiff Corporation in 1913. It has been listed Grade II by Cadw since May 2002.

The Mansion House was used as the home of the Lord Mayors of Cardiff until 1971. It has two apartments on the first floor and was also used by judges sitting in the city. The building had a major overhaul in 1998, for the Cardiff European Council summit held on 15 and 16 June 1998. It was then used by Cardiff Council for events, functions, civil ceremonies and weddings. It was also the base for the council's protocol team.

See also 
West Grove, Cardiff
List of mayors of Cardiff

References

External links 
Original plans of the Mansion House
Mansion House website

Mayors' mansions in the United Kingdom
Grade II listed buildings in Cardiff
Houses in Cardiff
Houses completed in 1896
Roath
Grade II listed houses in Wales